In mathematics, the noncommutative symmetric functions form a Hopf algebra NSymm analogous to the Hopf algebra of symmetric functions. The Hopf algebra NSymm was introduced by Israel M. Gelfand, Daniel Krob, Alain Lascoux, Bernard Leclerc, Vladimir Retakh, and Jean-Yves Thibon. It is noncommutative but cocommutative graded Hopf algebra. It has the Hopf algebra of symmetric functions as a quotient, and is a subalgebra of the Hopf algebra of permutations, and is the graded dual of the Hopf algebra of quasisymmetric function. Over the rational numbers it is isomorphic as a Hopf algebra to the universal enveloping algebra of the free Lie algebra on countably many variables.

Definition

The underlying algebra of the Hopf algebra of noncommutative symmetric functions is the free ring Z〈Z1, Z2,...〉 generated by non-commuting variables Z1, Z2, ...

The coproduct takes Zn to Σ Zi ⊗ Zn–i, where Z0 = 1 is the identity.

The counit takes Zi to 0 for i > 0 and takes Z0 = 1 to 1.

Related notions

Michiel Hazewinkel showed that a Hasse–Schmidt derivation

Relation to free Lie algebra
The element Σ Zntn is a group-like element of the Hopf algebra of formal power series over NSymm, so over the rationals its logarithm is primitive. The coefficients of its logarithm generate the free Lie algebra on a countable set of generators over the rationals. Over the rationals this identifies the Hopf algebra NSYmm with the universal enveloping algebra of the free Lie algebra.

References

Hopf algebras